Tom "Honest Man" Coughlan (born 1881) was an Irish hurler who played as a centre-back for the Cork senior team.

Coughlan joined the team during the 1901 championship and was a regular member of the starting fifteen until his retirement after the 1911 championship. During that time he captained the team on numerous occasions and won two All-Ireland medals and four Munster medals.

At club level Coughlan was a multiple county club championship medalist with Blackrock.

Coughlan came from a family of other hurlers, and his brothers, Pat, Denis and Dan, all won All-Ireland medals with Cork. His nephews, Eudie and John, were also All-Ireland medalists in the 1920s and 1930s.

References

 

1881 births
Blackrock National Hurling Club hurlers
Cork inter-county hurlers
All-Ireland Senior Hurling Championship winners
Year of death missing